Alan Herd  is a British artisan, a specialist woodworker and TV presenter of hobby and restoration projects often screened on Discovery Real Time TV channels.

A native of Hickling, a village in south Nottinghamshire near to Melton Mowbray and the border with Leicestershire, Herd was concerned about the increasing flood risk across the world, and developed a defence system called Wata-Wall, a flexible barrage system of portable interlocking plastic containers which are assembled into an array then filled with water for stability, creating a temporary dam. All association with "Wata-Wall" and Willy Johnson has now ceased but invention is still a big part of Alan's life.

Shows

Challenge Tommy Walsh with Tommy Walsh
Narrow Boat
Narrow Boat Afloat
Narrow Boat Afloat 2
Restoration man with Eric Knowles
Barn free
The Water Boatman with Alan Herd

References

British television personalities
Living people
Year of birth missing (living people)